The Rhodesian Ridgeback is a large dog breed bred in the Southern Africa region. Its forebears can be traced to the semi-domesticated ridged hunting and guardian dogs of the Khoikhoi. These were interbred with European dogs by the early colonists of the Cape Colony for assisting in the hunting of lions. 

The original breed standard was drafted by F.R. Barnes, in Bulawayo, Southern Rhodesia (now Zimbabwe), in 1922, and approved by the South African Kennel Union in 1927. The Rhodesian Ridgeback at present is the only registered breed indigenous to Southern Africa. The breed displays characteristics of a sighthound, scent hound and mastiff.

History 

The Khoikhoi people who lived the Cape Peninsula when the Dutch began trading with the area during the mid 17th century, had a semi-wild hunting dog which was described by Europeans as absolutely fearless and ferocious when acting as a guard dog. The ears have been described both as erect but later described as hanging due to interbreeding with European dogs, but the most distinctive feature was the length of hair often growing in the reverse direction along its back. Within 53 years of the first Dutch settlements in Southern Africa, the Europeans were using these local dogs themselves.

By the early 1800s, European colonists had also imported a variety of mainly European dog breeds to this area of Africa, including such dedicated hunting dogs as Greyhounds, Mastiffs, Great Danes and Bloodhounds. The Dogo Cubano (Cuban Bloodhound), an extinct breed used for dogfighting and guarding, was highly emphasized in the composition of the early Rhodesian Ridgeback. Genetic analysis indicates that the Rhodesian Ridgeback and the Great Dane fall within the same genetic clade (group), which implies the Dane's major contribution. These breeds were bred with the indigenous African dogs, including the dog of the Khoikhoi people, which resulted in the Boer hunting dogs, generically called names such as boerhond (Boer hound) in Dutch; then its descendant language of Afrikaans, which are the chief forerunners to the modern Rhodesian Ridgeback. The sequencing of ancient dog genomes indicates that the southern African Rhodesian Ridgeback retains 4% pre-colonial ancestry.

The Rev. Charles Helm (1844–1915), son of the Rev. Daniel Helm of the London Missionary Society, was born in the Cape Colony, joined the London Missionary Society himself, and moved from the Zuurbraak (now Suurbraak) mission station just east of Swellendam (modern Western Cape Province, South Africa) to the Hope Fountain Mission in Matabeleland, Southern Rhodesia, travelling from October 1874 to December 1875, then bringing two ridged dog bitches from somewhere between Kimberley (modern Northern Cape Province, South Africa) and Swellendam with him to Hope Fountain in 1879 en route to becoming, as it would turn out, a political advisor to King Lobengula, house-host to hunter-explorer Frederick Courteney Selous, postmaster of Bulawayo and well-appreciated tooth-extractor. At Hope Fountain, now part of the city of Bulawayo, fellow South African transplant Cornelius van Rooyen (b. 1860, Uitenhage, modern Eastern Cape Province, South Africa), a big–game hunter, was married to Maria Vermaak of Bloemhof by Charles Helm in 1879 the same year Helm brought his two rough-coated grey-black bitches to the Mission. Van Rooyen saw Helm's pair of bitches and decided to breed his own dogs with them to incorporate their guarding abilities.

After initially greyer, rough-coated litters originating from Helm's dogs, van Rooyen's subsequently crossed offspring turned to redder coats, incorporating the Khoikhoi landrace dog's ridges already carried in Boer dogs within his genomes. They became the foundation stock of a kennel which developed dogs over the next 35 years with the ability to bay a lion, to not attack it outright but to harass it by darting in and out with quick snaps and confusing the animal until the hunter shot it. These dogs were used to hunt lions, boars and other big game as well as to clear farmlands of wild pigs and baboons, and they can kill a baboon independently of a human hunter's collaboration.

The original breed standard was drafted in 1922 by F. R. Barnes on founding the first Rhodesian Ridgeback Club at a Bulawayo Kennel Club show, then in Southern Rhodesia (now in Zimbabwe), and based on that of the Dalmatian. In 1927, Barnes' standard was approved by the South African Kennel Union. Outside the subcontinent and internationally, the first Rhodesian Ridgebacks in Britain were shown by Mrs. Edward Foljambe in 1928. In 1950, Mr. and Mrs. William H. O'Brien of Arizona brought six carefully selected Rhodesian Ridgebacks to the US from South Africa. He and his wife and Margaret Lowthian of California began the process of getting the breed accepted by the American Kennel Club. Similarly, in 1952, The Rhodesian Ridgeback Club of Great Britain was founded at Crufts to promote the breed around the United Kingdom to show judges, so a standard for the breed might be recognised. In 1954 the first Challenge Certificates were awarded to dogs shown as Rhodesian Ridgebacks at United Kingdom competitions, toward their subsequent recognition by The Kennel Club of Great Britain, and in 1955 the American Kennel Club recognised the Rhodesian Ridgeback breed as a member of the hound group.

The Rhodesian Ridgeback is the mascot and the Ontario Tech Ridgebacks are the intercollegiate athletic teams of Ontario Tech University in Oshawa, Ontario, Canada.

Description

Appearance

The appearance standard of the Rhodesian Ridgeback originated in Rhodesia (Zimbabwe) and goes back to the year 1922, and by 2019 this standard had remained virtually unchanged. The Rhodesian Ridgeback's distinguishing feature is the ridge of hair running along its back in the opposite direction from the rest of its coat. It consists of a fan-like area formed by two whorls of hair (called "crowns") and tapers from immediately behind the shoulders down to the level of the hips. It is believed to originate from the dog used by the original African dog population which had a similar ridge.

Rhodesian Ridgebacks are typically very muscular and have a light wheaten to red wheaten coat, which should be short, dense, sleek and glossy in appearance, and neither woolly nor silky.

White is acceptable on the chest and toes. The presence of black guard hairs or ticking is not addressed in the AKC standard, although the elaboration of the AKC standard notes the amount of black or dark brown in the coat should not be excessive. The FCI standard states that excessive black hairs throughout the coat are highly undesirable. Rhodesian Ridgebacks sometimes have a dark mask. The dog's nose should be black or liver in keeping with the colour of the dog. No other coloured nose is permissible. The brown nose is a recessive gene. It is not as common as a black nose; some breeders believe the inclusion of brown noses in a breeding program is necessary for maintaining the vibrancy of the coat. The eyes should be round and should reflect the dog's colour: dark eyes with a black nose, amber eyes with a brown (liver) nose.

Rhodesian Ridgebacks Had For Movies, Commercials & Shows:

 Hintza From  A Far Off Place
 Mobo From Pup Star World Tour
 Dog From Opendoor Commercial
 Horror Hound From Dark Vindicta (2020)
 Pongo From TBS (American TV channel) Junkyard Dogs (2024)
 Louis From The Supervet: Noel Fitzpatrick

Other dog breeds also have a reverse line of fur along the spine, including the Phu Quoc ridgeback dog and Thai Ridgeback. The Thai Ridgeback is a crossbreed of the Phu Quoc; historians have speculated the relationship between the Rhodesian Ridgeback and the Phu Quoc with suggestions that historically one breed may have been imported to the other's location.

Temperament 
Rhodesian Ridgebacks are known to be loyal and intelligent. They are typically somewhat aloof to strangers; this is not to be confused with aggression, a Rhodesian Ridgeback with a good temperament will not attack a stranger for no reason. They require consistent training and correct socialization; therefore they are often not the best choice for inexperienced dog owners and families with younger children.

Despite Rhodesian Ridgebacks being extremely athletic and sometimes imposing, they do have a sensitive side. Francis R. Barnes, who wrote the first standard in 1922, acknowledged that, "rough treatment ... should never be administered to these dogs, especially when they are young. They go to pieces with handling of that kind." The Rhodesian Ridgeback accepts correction as long as it is fair and justified, and as long as it comes from someone the dog knows and trusts.

Genetics of the ridge

The genotype responsible for the ridge was recently found by a consortium of researchers at the Swedish University of Agricultural Sciences (Nicolette Salmon Hillbertz, Göran Andersson, et al.), Uppsala University (Leif Andersson, Mats Nilsson, et al.) and the Broad Institute (Kerstin Lindblad-Toh, et al.).

The only disqualification in the AKC standard for this breed is "ridgelessness". This term refers to the purebred offspring of heterozygous parental animals that do not inherit a copy of the ridge mutation from either parent and thus lack the classic ridged back. The most current research suggests that the ridge mutation is autosomal dominant with near-complete penetrance: 95% of heterozygous dogs have a ridged back. Well under 25% of puppies lack a ridge, indicating a significant proportion of the breed are homozygous for the mutation.

The genetic test which distinguishes dominant homozygotes (R/R - two ridge genes) from heterozygotes (R/r - one ridge gene) is available (www.genocan.eu/en). Using the genetic test, a breeder may accurately predict birth of ridgeless puppies. 

Traditionally, many Rhodesian Ridgeback puppies were culled at birth for numerous reasons, including ridgelessness. Contemporary breeders are increasingly opting for surgical sterilisation of these offspring to ensure they will not be bred but can live into maturity as non-showing, non-breeding pets. Some breed parent clubs and canine registries in Europe have even made the culling of ridgeless whelps a requirement. It was pointed out on the BBC One investigative documentary Pedigree Dogs Exposed that the Rhodesian Ridgeback Club of Great Britain's "code of ethics", which is ratified annually by the kennel club states that "Ridgeless puppies shall be culled", and that "mismarked" puppies will only ever be sold on condition that they are never shown, and are neutered. The Rhodesian Ridgeback Club defended itself pointing to the statement that follows, "if a breeder finds this morally impossible [to cull the puppy] the puppy shall be homed..." as indication that culling is not mandatory, but preferred. It was only after the publicity surrounding the promotion of culling that they reversed their code of ethics to say "no healthy puppy will be culled".

Health 

Health conditions that are known to affect the Rhodesian Ridgeback breed are hip dysplasia and dermoid sinus. The Rhodesian Ridgeback ranks number six in terms of most affected breeds for thyroid problems recorded by the Orthopedic Foundation for Animals. In 2014, the UK breed survey reported an average lifespan of 11 years.

Dermoid sinus
Dermoid sinus is a congenital neural-tube defect that is known to affect this breed. The dermoid is often likened to a thin "spaghetti strand" beneath the skin. Puppies should always be screened at birth by the breeder and veterinarian, and the examination repeated as the puppies grow before they go to their new homes. This is done by palpation of the subcutaneous dorsal midline from the base of the skull to the insertion of the tail. Surgical removal is an option for affected neonates, puppies and adult dogs. All affected dogs, even those surgically corrected, should be spayed or neutered and never be bred, since surgical dermoid sinus removal can be extremely cost prohibitive, and because many unremoved dermoid sinuses will eventually abscess. Abscessed dermoid sinuses will be at best a recurrent, painful problem, and if the sinus communicates with the tissues around the spinal cord, cause meningitis and often death. However, it has been shown that supplementation of folic acid to the diet of the brood bitch before mating and during pregnancy reduces the incidence of dermoid sinus. One study on the Swedish population estimates that 8-10% are affected. Slightly less than 5% of Rhodesian Ridgebacks were reported to be affected with the condition in a US breed club survey.

Degenerative myelopathy
Degenerative myelopathy (DM) is a neurological disease of the spinal cord causing progressive paraparesis, most commonly in the German shepherd dog breed. It affects Rhodesian Ridgebacks at a rate of only 0.75%. Signs of degenerative myelopathy are characterised at the beginning with foot dragging, and slipping of the rear limbs. The disease progresses to the point where the animal can no longer stand or walk on its own. Progression has been known to take as little as six months, or several years. There is a DNA test available to test for the gene. Animals who are at risk for the disease should not be bred to other animals at risk, as this creates future generations of this debilitating disease.

Hypothyroid
Hypothyroidism is a growing problem in the Rhodesian Ridgeback, and this condition causes a multitude of symptoms, including weight gain and hair loss. Treatment for hypothyroidism in dogs consists of an inexpensive once-daily oral medication. Dr. Lorna Kennedy at the University of Manchester's Centre for Integrated Genomic Medical Research in England has found the haplotype (group of genes), which, when present, double the chances of a Rhodesian Ridgeback becoming hypothyroid due to lymphocytic thyroiditis. This is important to the breed because lymphocytic thyroiditis is the overwhelming cause of hypothyroidism in Rhodesian Ridgebacks.

Gastric dilatation volvulus
Like many other deep-chested breeds, the Rhodesian Ridgeback is prone to gastric dilatation volvulus, commonly known as bloat. This is a potentially fatal condition that requires immediate treatment.

Resources
RRCUS H&G - the Rhodesian Ridgeback Club of the United States maintains a web site devoted to the breed's health issues that also gathers ongoing research for their Health & Genetics Committee. This group recommends that breeders perform at least four health screenings: hips, elbows, thyroid and eyes, with cardiac and hearing tests optional.

CRRHS - it is also recommended that all ridgeback owners enter their dogs' information in the Comprehensive Rhodesian Ridgeback Health Survey.

See also
 Dogs portal
 List of dog breeds
 Hound

References

Sources

External links

* 
History of the Rhodesian Ridgeback- from the archive of the history and life of Rhodesia.

FCI breeds
Dog breeds originating in Africa
Ridgeback dogs
Sighthounds